The Kortenbach & Rauh Kora 1 was an unusual twin boom, pusher configuration motor glider, designed and built in Germany in the 1970s and intended as a training aircraft.

Design and development

The Kora was a two-seat side by side motorglider, intended as a trainer.  Its long span, high aspect ratio wing gave it a respectable gliding performance.  The overall layout was unusual, with a central pod fuselage in front of a pusher configuration engine and with its empennage on twin tail booms.  It had a powered aircraft style tricycle undercarriage.

The Kora was an all-wood aircraft and its constructors, Kortenbach & Rauh, were best known as furniture makers. It had a cantilever high wing with a constant chord centre section and tapered outer panels. Schempp-Hirth airbrakes opened over the upper, inner wing surfaces from mid-chord. Instructor and pupil sat side-by-side, with the  Limbach SL 1700EC1 air cooled flat four piston engine behind them, where the wing became broader to allow propeller clearance.

Two slender, tapering booms ran rearwards from the wing, each ending at a straight edged fin which tapered both above and below it.  A tapered, straight edged tailplane was carried on top of the fins, projecting outwards. The rudders and one piece elevator were rectangular.

Two prototypes were built, the first flying ion 13 September 1973. This had a fully retracting tricycle undercarriage with mainwheels retracting rearwards into the tail booms and the nosewheel rearwards into the fuselage pod. The second prototype, which flew in 1976, retained the retractable nosewheel but had fixed, spatted mainwheels on thin, cantilever, spring steel legs mounted on the lower fuselage to save weight and reduce complexity.

The second prototype was still undergoing flight tests early in 1978, when no decision on production had been reached despite orders for some twelve aircraft.  It remained on the German civil aircraft register in 2010.

Specifications (fixed undercarriage)

References

Motor gliders
Single-engined pusher aircraft
Twin-boom aircraft
1970s German sailplanes
Aircraft first flown in 1973
High-wing aircraft